Selatosomus is a genus of beetles belonging to the family Elateridae. The species of this genus are found in Europe, Japan, southern Africa and North America, and most of the species were formerly included in the genus Ctenicera.

Selected species
 
Selatosomus aeneus 
Selatosomus aeripennis 
Selatosomus amplicollis 
Selatosomus appropinquans 
Selatosomus carbo 
Selatosomus caucasicus 
Selatosomus confluens 
Selatosomus coreanus
Selatosomus cruciatus 
Selatosomus destructor 
Selatosomus festivus 
Selatosomus funereus 
Selatosomus gloriosus 
Selatosomus graecus 
Selatosomus grandis
Selatosomus huanghaoi 
Selatosomus jailensis 
Selatosomus lateralis 
Selatosomus latus 
Selatosomus melancholicus 
Selatosomus miegi 
Selatosomus montanus 
Selatosomus morulus 
Selatosomus nigricans 
Selatosomus pruininus 
Selatosomus puerilis
Selatosomus pulcher 
Selatosomus rugosus
Selatosomus semimetallicus 
Selatosomus sexualis 
Selatosomus splendens 
Selatosomus suckleyi 
Selatosomus tauricus

References

Elateridae
Elateridae genera